Jit Vinayak Arolkar is an Indian politician from Goa and a member of the Goa Legislative Assembly. Arolkar won the Mandrem Assembly constituency on the Maharashtrawadi Gomantak Party ticket in the 2022 Goa Legislative Assembly election. He defeated Dayanand Sopte of Bharatiya Janata Party by 715 votes.

References

1982 births
Living people
Goa MLAs 2022–2027
Maharashtrawadi Gomantak Party politicians
People from North Goa district